Miranpur may refer to:

 Miranpur, Bhulath, a village in Kapurthala district, Punjab, India
 Miranpur, Nakodar, a village in Jalandhar district, Punjab, India
 Miranpur, Phagwara, a village in Kapurthala district, Punjab, India
 Miranpur, Punjab, a town in Lahore District, Punjab, Pakistan
 Miranpur, Sindh, a village in Naushahro Feroze, Sindh, Pakistan
 Miranpur, Sultanpur Lodhi, a village in Kapurthala district, Punjab, India
 Miranpur, Uttar Pradesh, a town in Muzaffarnagar district, Uttar Pradesh, India

See also
 Miran Pur, a village in Rajanpur district, Punjab, Pakistan